James Louis Chirillo (born May 2, 1953) is an American jazz guitarist, banjoist, composer, arranger, and band leader.

Career 
From 1977 to 1979, Chirillo performed regularly with singers Marilyn Maye, Vic Damone, Joey Heatherton, Lorna Luft, and pianist Roger Williams.  From 1979 to 1982, he was a member of The Jazz Knights at West Point, the jazz ensemble of the United States Military Academy Band, a premier band of the United States armed forces.

In 1982, he moved to New York City. He studied and performed with Tiny Grimes. From 1985 to 1986, he was a member of Benny Goodman's last band. From 1987 to 1991, he was a member of the Buck Clayton Orchestra and toured Europe in July 1991. He performed with Claude Williams in President Bill Clinton's inaugural festivities, with Bob Wilber and the Carnegie Hall Jazz Band, Benny Carter, and the Lincoln Center Jazz Orchestra directed by Wynton Marsalis. From 1992 to 1999 he was a charter member of the Smithsonian Jazz Masterworks Orchestra, directed by Gunther Schuller and David Baker.

Education 
Chirillo studied at the University of North Texas College of Music. During the 1976–1977 academic year, he was the guitarist for the One O'Clock Lab Band. His major concentration was composition and he studied guitar with Jack Petersen.

In 1976, with the One O'Clock Lab Band, Chirillo toured the Soviet Union (Moscow, Volgograd, and Yerevan), Portugal, and England — 5 cities, 25 concerts, 77 encores, 82,800 attendees. The tour was sponsored by the US Department of State as part of a US Bicentennial goodwill arts outreach. NBC broadcast the July 4 concert live from Moscow as part of its US Bicentennial commemorative. While on tour, members of the band held jam sessions with musicians from Moscow, Volgograd, and Yerevan.

After college, Chirillo studied composition and arranging with John Carisi and Bill Finegan. He also studied guitar with Remo Palmier.

Discography

As leader
 Sultry Serenade (Nagel Heyer, 2000)

As sideman
With Kenny Davern
 At the Mill Hill Playhouse (Arbors, 2003)
 In Concert at the Outpost Performance Space, Albuquerque 2004 (Arbors, 2005)
 Dialogues (Arbors, 2007)

With One O'Clock Lab Band
 Lab '76 (NTSU Jazz, 1976)
 Lab '77 (NTSU Jazz, 1977)
 Jazz at Spoleto '77 Left Bank (Jazz Society 1978)
 Lab '78 (NTSU Jazz, 1978)

With Houston Person
 Thinking of You (HighNote, 2007)
 Mellow (HighNote, 2009)
 Something Personal (HighNote, 2015)

With others
 Eddie Bert, Walk on the Roots (Mothlight Music, 1993)
 Dan Block, Plays the Music of Duke Ellington (Miles High, 2010)
 Carter Burwell, The Man Who Wasn't There (Decca, 2001)
 Evan Christopher, The Remembering Song (Arbors, 2010)
 Buck Clayton, Swings the Village (Nagel Heyer, 2002)
 John Cocuzzi, Groove Merchant (Arbors, 2011)
 Benny Goodman, Let's Dance: A Musical Tribute (MusicMasters, 1985)
 Benny Goodman, Live, State University of New York (Jazz Heritage Society/MusicMasters, 1986)
 Keith Ingham, Jazz It Up with Bayer (Bayer 1994)
 Keith Ingham, A Star Dust Melody (Sackville, 1998)
 Doug Lawrence, Doug Lawrence Trio with Dave Leone and James Chirillo (Do La Di Jazz, 1981)
 Barbara Lea & Keith Ingham, Celebrate Vincent Youmans (A Records, 2004)
 Joe Lovano, Rush Hour (Blue Note, 1995)
 Cécile McLorin Salvant, WomanChild (Justin Time, 2013)
 Bob Mintzer, Homage to Count Basie (DMP, 2000)
 Joe Muranyi, Moon Over Marstons Mills (JLX Kiado, 2008)
 Scott Robinson, Melody from the Sky (Arbors, 2000)
 Cynthia Sayer, String Swing (Jazzology, 2000)
 Randy Sandke, The Re-discovered Louis and Bix (Nagel Heyer, 2000)
 Loren Schoenberg, Just A-Settin' and A-Rockin (Musicmasters, 1990)
 Loren Schoenberg, Out of This World (TCB, 1998)
 Dick Sudhalter, Get Out and Get Under the Moon (Stomp Off, 1990)
 Dick Sudhalter, Melodies Heard...Melodies Sweet (Challenge, 1999)
 Pablo Villegas, Americano (Harmonia Mundi, 2015)
 Bob Wilber & Dick Hyman, A Perfect Match (Arbors, 1998)
 Bob Wilber & Kenny Davern, Summit Reunion in Atlanta (Jazzology, 2001)
 Claude Williams, Live at J's Part 1 (Arhoolie, 1993)
 Claude Williams, Live at J's Part 2 (Arhoolie, 1993)
 Jack Wilson, In New York (DIW, 1993)

Performances and broadcasts 

 Buck Clayton Live: Village Vanguard, February 16, 17, 18, 1990 (Nagel-Heyer, 1990)
 Jimmy McPartland Funeral
 Church of the Heavenly Rest, Upper East Side, Manhattan
 March 1991
 Ruby Braff, cornet; Marian McPartland, piano; James Chirillo, guitar
 Jimmy died March 13 and Braff played at Marian's request
 Around New York, CD of radio program broadcast on WNYC; Steve Sullivan (born 1954), host
 Stephen Gosling, Zuying Song, piano ; Eddie Bert, trombone; Stephen Roane, bass; James Chirillo, guitar
 New York City, August 18, 1994; 
 The Electric Guitar Ensemble, The Super 400, University of North Texas College of Music
 "Bye Bye Blackbird," arranged by Chirillo
 Sammy Sherman, Live at Chan's (Arbors, 1997)
 (recorded November 7, 1997 at Chan's, Woonsocket, Rhode Island)
 New York Philharmonic at the Cathedral of St. John the Divine), Alan Gilbert, conductor
 Memorial Day Concert, Tribute to Kurt Masur
 Live at the Cathedral of St. John the Divine, Manhattan, May 30, 2016
 Soloists: Wynton Marsalis (trumpet); Thomas Hampson (baritone voice)
 John Rosamond Johnson, James Weldon Johnson, Bob Cole, "Oh, Didn't He Ramble" (1902)
 Other musicians: Marcus Printup (trumpet), Vincent Gardener (trombone), Dan Block (clarinet), Ibanda Ruhumbika (sousaphone), James Chirillo (banjo), Joe Saylor (snare drum), Ali Jackson (bass drum)
 

As member of the Smithsonian Jazz Masterworks Orchestra

 Live at Lincoln Theatre, Washington, D.C., August 16 and 17, 1997
 Blues and the Abstract Truth: The Music of Oliver Nelson (broadcast on NPR)

 Tribute to a Generation:  A Salute to the Big Bands of the WWII Era (Smithsonian Folkways, 2004)
 Recorded on various dates in Washington, D.C., in tribute to the following bandleaders:
 Lionel Hampton: "Flying Home," May 20 & 21, 1995
 Artie Shaw: "'S Wonderful," June 20 & 21, 1992
 Benny Carter: "Ill Wind," July 19 & 20, 1997
 Tommy Dorsey: "Chloe," August 12 & 13, 1995 
 Artie Shaw: "Begin the Beguine," July 18 & 19, 1998
<li> Duke Ellington: "Sepia Panorama," July 31, 1993
 Benny Goodman: "Back Bay Boogie," July 19 & 20, 1997
 Glenn Miller: "The Song of the Volga Boatmen," July 25 & 26, 1992
 Artie Shaw: "Summertime," July 18 & 19, 1998
<li> Duke Ellington: "Take the "A" Train," June 20 & 21, 1992
 Benny Carter: "Back Bay Boogie," July 19 & 20, 1997
<li> Duke Ellington: "Cotton Tail," April 29 & 30, 1995
 Tommy Dorsey: "Swanee River," August 12 & 13, 1995
<li> Duke Ellington: "Rain Check," May 9, 1993
 Artie Shaw: "Back Bay Shuffle," July 18 & 19, 1998
<li> Duke Ellington: "Just A-Sittin' and A-Rockin'" July 18 & 19, 1998
 Tommy Dorsey: "Hallelujah," August 12 & 13, 1995
 Unissued:
 Jimmie Lunceford: "Blue Blazes," August 12 & 13, 1995

Broadway

 Come Fly Away, March 1, 2010 – September 5, 2010 (188 performances)

Published music and papers 
Compositions and arrangements
 "Prelude" (to a minor insensitivity), for the Gotham Wind Symphony (n.d.)
 "March," dedicated to the memory of Bill Finegan, for the Gotham Wind Symphony (n.d.)
 "Love Was Right For Us," lyrics by Tanyayette Charlaisse Willoughby (born 1957), music by Chirillo (1984)
 "When You're in Mind," lyrics Judy Spencer, music by Chirillo (1985)
 "Now I know Why" (1989)
 "Skytime Samba" (1989)
 "Pulsación No. 1," by Astor Piazzolla, arranged by Chirillo (n.d.)
 "Work Song Blues" (1991)
 "God Rest You Merry, Gentlemen," arranged by Chirillo (1992)
 "Manhattan Work Song," for the Loren Schoenberg Jazz Orchestra (1993)
 "Bittersweet" (1994)
 Valse Prismatique, for Warren Vaché and the Scottish String Ensemble
 On Warren Vaché's 2006 album, Don't Look Back (see discography)
 Homage Concerto, for clarinet and jazz orchestra, Val-Doc Music (ASCAP) (1996); 
 Composed and arranged by Chirillo
 Written for Ken Peplowski with the Loren Schoenberg Jazz Orchestra
 "Swing"
 "Elegy"
 "Driving"

 Grainger Suite (on two of Percy Grainger's tunes (2002)
 "Sussex Mummers' Christmas Carol"
 "Hill-Song No. 2"

Papers
 James Chirillo, "Comments About the One-Note Chord Theory" (October 2002)

Interviews
 James Chirillo interviewed by Monk Rowe, New York City, January 12, 2007, Hamilton College Jazz Archive (DVD) (2007);

Notes and references

Notes

References

External links
 

1953 births
Living people
Hard bop guitarists
American jazz guitarists
American jazz banjoists
Swing guitarists
American male guitarists
20th-century American guitarists
21st-century American guitarists
American jazz composers
American male jazz composers
American music arrangers
Jazz arrangers
American jazz bandleaders
People from Teaneck, New Jersey
University of North Texas College of Music alumni
United States Military Academy people
United States Army Band musicians
20th-century American male musicians
21st-century American male musicians
Arbors Records artists